Minquan railway station is a station on Longhai railway in Minquan County, Shangqiu, Henan.

History
The station was established in 1915.

See also
 Minquan North railway station

References

Railway stations in Henan
Stations on the Longhai Railway
Railway stations in China opened in 1915